How Sweet It Is is a cover album by Joan Osborne. It was released on September 17, 2002 by Compendia.

Track listing
"I'll Be Around" (Thom Bell, Phil Hurtt)
"Think" (Aretha Franklin, Teddy White)
"How Sweet It Is" (Lamont Dozier, Brian Holland, Eddie Holland)
"Smiling Faces Sometimes" (Barrett Strong, Norman Whitfield)
"Love's in Need of Love Today" (Stevie Wonder)
"These Arms of Mine" (Otis Redding)
"Only You Know and I Know" (Dave Mason)
"War" (Strong, Whitfield)
"Why Can't We Live Together" (Timmy Thomas)
"Axis: Bold as Love" (Jimi Hendrix)
"The Weight" (Robbie Robertson)
"Everybody Is a Star" (Sly Stone)

Credits
Mixed By – Kevin Killen 
Producer – John Leventhal, Rick Depofi

References

External links
PopMatters review
 

2002 albums
Covers albums
Joan Osborne albums
Albums produced by John Leventhal